Krasimir Tumanov (born 13 October 1961) is a Bulgarian swimmer. He competed in the men's 4 × 200 metre freestyle relay at the 1980 Summer Olympics.

References

1961 births
Living people
Bulgarian male swimmers
Olympic swimmers of Bulgaria
Swimmers at the 1980 Summer Olympics
Place of birth missing (living people)
20th-century Bulgarian people
21st-century Bulgarian people